Mount Olive is a census-designated place in Coosa County, Alabama, United States. Its population was 311 as of the 2020 census.

Demographics

References

Census-designated places in Coosa County, Alabama
Census-designated places in Alabama